Harris Academy Riverside is a sixth-form entry coeducational secondary school and sixth form located in the Purfleet in the Thurrock unitary authority, Essex, England. Purfleet is bordered by the A13 road to the north and the River Thames to the south and is within the easternmost part of the M25 motorway but just outside the Greater London boundary. As its name suggests, the school is on the riverside, but separated from the water by a railway line.

The school was established in 2017 but moved into a new dedicated building in 2019.

Building
The new buildings were designed by LSI Architects. They are part of a larger scheme to regenerate Purfleet town centre. The £23M academy is split into two blocks: a four storey teaching block, and a two storey sports block. They will accommodate a 900 pupil secondary school and a 250 student sixth form. The blocks are of conventional construction and use strong branding colour to articulate particular aspects of the facade.

Curriculum 
Up to July 2020 the school taught Key Stage 3 years 7 to 9, and had no Key Stage 4. Virtually all maintained schools and academies follow the National Curriculum, and are inspected by Ofsted on how well they succeed in delivering a 'broad and balanced curriculum', to the three year groups in Key Stage 3. Harris Academy Riverside, as a new school, awaits its first Ofsted inspection.

It started to teach year 10s in September 2020; it will endeavour to get all students to achieve the English Baccalaureate (EBACC) qualification- this must include core subjects a modern or ancient foreign language, and either History or Geography.

The academy believes it should encourage its student to read around the subjects they are formally studying and produces personalised 'prep packs', with guidance, extra material, extra reading and video links. As of September 2021, a total of 50 new staff members have joined the academy to accommodate the number of students enrolled.

Sixth form consortium
Riverside is in the Chafford Hundred Sixth Form Consortium, with Harris Academy Chafford Hundred and
Harris Academy Ockendon. Riverside specialises in mathematics and sciences and has the specialist labs needed to teach them.

References

External links
 Harris Academy Riverside official website

Secondary schools in Thurrock
Riverside
Educational institutions established in 2017
2017 establishments in England
Free schools in London
Specialist science colleges in England